Devils Paw (or Devil's Paw, or Boundary Peak 93) is the high point of the Juneau Icefield, on the Alaska-British Columbia border. It is a part of the Boundary Ranges of the Coast Mountains. It is notable for its steep rise above the low local terrain. Its height is sometimes given as 8,507 feet (2,593 m).

Devils Paw is located on the northeast side of the Juneau Icefield, and its north slopes feed Tulsequah Lake and the Tulsequah Glacier. Its south slope forms the head of the picturesquely-named "Hades Highway", which is the eastern extremity of the Icefield.

To illustrate the steepness of the peak: the north face drops  in approximately three miles (4.8 km), and the southeast side drops  in about seven miles (11.3 km).


Climate

Based on the Köppen climate classification, Devils Paw is located in a subpolar oceanic climate zone, with long, cold, snowy winters, and cool summers. Temperatures can drop below −20 °C with wind chill factors below −30 °C.

See also

List of mountain peaks of North America
List of mountain peaks of Canada
List of mountain peaks of the United States

References

  If the height is actually 8,507 feet (2,593 m) then the prominence is reduced to 5,610 feet (1,710 m).
  E.g.

Sources
 Devils Paw on Topozone

External links

Devils Paw weather: Mountain-Forecast.com
Picture of Devil's Paw from Mt. Moore

Mountains of Juneau, Alaska
Boundary Ranges
Mountains of Alaska
Canada–United States border
International mountains of North America
Two-thousanders of British Columbia